Standings and results for Group 4 of the UEFA Euro 1992 qualifying tournament.

Group 4 consisted of Austria, Denmark, the Faroe Islands, Northern Ireland and Yugoslavia. Yugoslavia won the group, but the team (as FR Yugoslavia) was banned from the final tournament. It was the first international tournament for the Faroe Islands and the win against Austria their first competitive win.

Final table

Results

Goalscorers

References
UEFA website

Attendances - 

Group 4
1990–91 in Yugoslav football
1991–92 in Yugoslav football
1990–91 in Danish football
Qual
1990–91 in Austrian football
1991–92 in Austrian football
1990–91 in Northern Ireland association football
1991–92 in Northern Ireland association football
1990 in Faroe Islands football
1991 in Faroe Islands football